Pterolophia ochreotriangularis is a species of beetle in the family Cerambycidae. It was described by Stephan von Breuning in 1958.

References

ochreotriangularis
Beetles described in 1958